The Catalão Microregion is a statistical microregion created by IBGE (Instituto Brasileiro de Geografia e Estatística) in south-eastern Goiás state, Brazil. A region of rolling hills and flatlands with extensive cattle raising and soybean plantations.  The regional center, Catalão, is growing fast with important industries being installed in the area.  The GDP of this region represented almost 5% of the state GDP in 2003.

Municipalities 
The microregion consists of the following municipalities:

Population figures are from 2007.

See also
List of municipalities in Goiás
Microregions of Goiás

References

Microregions of Goiás